The 2006 California State Assembly elections were held on November 7, 2006. Voters in all 80 districts of the California State Assembly voted for their representatives. The California Democratic Party retained its majority with 48 seats. The California Republican Party retained control of the remaining 32 seats. Neither party lost or gained any seats.

Overview

The 67th State Assembly district was left vacant after Republican Tom Harman won a special election to fill the 35th State Senate district on June 12, 2006. There was not enough time to schedule a special election for the Assembly seat, but Republican Jim Silva succeeded him after winning this election.

Results
The following are the final results from the Secretary of State of California.

District 1

District 2

District 3

District 4

District 5

District 6

District 7

District 8

District 9

District 10

District 11

District 12

District 13

District 14

District 15

District 16

District 17

District 18

District 19

District 20

District 21

District 22

District 23

District 24

District 25

District 26

District 27

District 28

District 29

District 30

District 31

District 32

District 33

District 34

District 35

District 36

District 37

District 38

District 39

District 40

District 41

District 42

District 43

District 44

District 45

District 46

District 47

District 48

District 49

District 50

District 51

District 52

District 53

District 54

District 55

District 56

District 57

District 58

District 59

District 60

District 61

District 62

District 63

District 64

District 65

District 66

District 67

District 68

District 69

District 70

District 71

District 72

District 73

District 74

District 75

District 76

District 77

District 78

District 79

District 80

See also 
California state elections, 2006
California State Senate elections, 2006

References 

State Assembly
2006
California State Assembly